The Artgemeinschaft Germanic Faith Community (abbreviated AG GGG) is a German Neopagan and Neo-Nazi organization founded in 1951 by Wilhelm Kusserow, a former member of the SS. In 1983, it merged with the Nordungen (founded 1924). From 1989 to 2009, it was headed by Jürgen Rieger.

The group has the legal status of a German registered Association ("eingetragener Verein") based in Berlin.

Ideology
Artgemeinschaft mixes far-right ideology with Nordic and Teutonic religions such as Ásatrú, but also elements of atheism. In the 1960s some theosophic and so called ariosophic aspects were added.

The weltanschauung of the party is xenophobic and antisemitic. A belief of the party is Artgemeinschaft (loosely translated as "racial community"), a basic tenet of which is the Artglaube ("racial belief").

In contrast to other pagan organisations, neither Guido von List nor Lanz von Liebenfels plays any role.

Important in their beliefs are theses by Schopenhauer, Nietzsche, Eduard v. Hartmann and Feuerbach in order to attack Christian moral and to replace it with a pagan one. According to Fromm, belief in Gods is not an important momentum for the Artgemeinschaft.

One symbol used by Artgemeinschaft is an eagle catching a Christian fish, known as Adler fängt Fisch or Adler fängt Ichthys, which symbolises the rejection of Christianity. It was registered as a trademark for the group in 2003, leading to neo-Nazis in Germany using the symbol afterwards. In 2012, this influenced the decision to reject a new coat of arms for the district of Mecklenburgische Seenplatte.

Membership and media
Membership is regulated according to racial criteria; only "northern born" people may become members. The members belong to different currents of the far-right, from militant neo-fascists to representatives of the Neue Rechte (New Right). The French theoretician of the New Right Pierre Krebs is member of Artgmeinschaft as well as the right-wing author Claus Nordbruch. Stephan Ernst, the murderer of politician Walter Lübcke was a member of Artgemeinschaft until 2011.

The AG GGG publishes the völkisch Nordische Zeitung.

Activies 
The Niedersachsen state office for the protection of the constitution named Artgemeinschaft in connection to right-wing settlement movements in Lower Saxony and Mecklenburg Vorpommern.

View 
"The Artgemeisnchaft is one of the toughest structures in the extreme right-wing.... It doesn't shut itself off from right-wing terrorism at all. The 'Artgemeinschaft' runs under the label of nature-religiousness and ancestral commemoration. But the 'Artgemeinschaft' is actually one of the most conspiratorial - and I would say - most dangerous structures that we have in Germany", said says right-wing extremism expert Andrea Röpke in 2022.

See also 

 Jürgen Rieger
 Esoteric Nazism
 Modern Paganism
 Eagle catching Fish

References

External links
 Official Website of the Artgemeinschaft

German nationalist organizations
Germanic mysticism
Neo-Nazism in Germany
Religion and race
Religious organizations established in 1951
Modern pagan organisations based in Germany
1951 establishments in Germany
Modern pagan organizations established in the 1950s